Carl Reiner was an actor, comedian, writer and director of film and television. Over Reiner's long television and film career, he earned numerous awards. From his stand-up comedy albums with Mel Brooks to writing on Your Show of Shows, Caesar's Hour, and The Dick Van Dyke Show, Reiner earned 11 Primetime Emmy Awards and one Grammy Award.

Major Awards

Emmy Awards

Grammy Awards

Guild Awards

Directors Guild of America

Writers Guild of America

Miscellaneous Awards

MTV Movie Awards

Phoenix Film Critics Society

Satellite Award

Saturn Awards

Teen Choice Awards

Honors
 1960 – Star on the Hollywood Walk of Fame, located at 6421 Hollywood Boulevard 
 1999 – Inducted into Television Hall of Fame
 2000 – Received the Mark Twain Prize for American Humor at the Kennedy Center.
 2017 – Carl and his son Rob Reiner became the first father-son duo to have their footprints and handprints added to a concrete slab at Grauman's Chinese Theater

References 

Lists of awards received by writer
Lists of awards received by film director
Lists of awards received by American actor